Scoparia charopoea is a moth in the family Crambidae. It was described by Turner in 1908. It is found in Australia, where it has been recorded from Queensland.

References

Moths described in 1908
Scorparia